José Roberto Fernandes Barbosa, or his nickname, Zé Roberto da Compensa is a Brazilian drug trafficker, leader and one of the founders of the Família do Norte criminal faction. He was born on December 1, 1972, he started early in the life of crime, at age 12 he had already been arrested 4 times. In 2018, they reported that he has Depression, Psychotic Break, and Anxiety Disorder.

He consolidated the FDN faction between 2010 and 2012, he is guilty of drug trafficking crimes, murders and a prison rebellion in 2017, which was responsible for 56 dead and 200 fugitive inmates.

See Also 

 Família do Norte

References 

1972 births
Brazilian gangsters
21st-century Brazilian criminals
Brazilian drug traffickers
People from Manaus
Prisoners and detainees of Brazil
Living people